The House at 25 High School Avenue in Quincy, Massachusetts, is one of the city's best-preserved Greek Revival cottages.  This -story wood-frame house was built in the 1850s; it has a typical side-hall plan, with a front gable roof, clapboard siding, and granite foundation.  It has corner pilasters, a fully pedimented gable end, and pedimented gables in its dormers.  This type of house was once quite common in the city.  It was owned by members of the Perry family until the 1910s.

The house was listed on the National Register of Historic Places in 1989.

See also
National Register of Historic Places listings in Quincy, Massachusetts

References

Houses completed in 1850
Houses in Quincy, Massachusetts
National Register of Historic Places in Quincy, Massachusetts
Houses on the National Register of Historic Places in Norfolk County, Massachusetts
Greek Revival architecture in Massachusetts